Taylor Thompson may refer to:
Taylor Thompson (American football) (born 1989), American football player
Taylor Thompson (baseball) (born 1987), baseball player